Atriplex longipes is a species of plant belonging to the family Amaranthaceae.

Its native range is northwestern and northern Europe.

References

longipes